In quantum mechanics, a Fock state or number state is a quantum state that is an element of a Fock space with a well-defined number of particles (or quanta). These states are named after the Soviet physicist Vladimir Fock. Fock states play an important role in the second quantization formulation of quantum mechanics.

The particle representation was first treated in detail by Paul Dirac for bosons and by Pascual Jordan and Eugene Wigner for fermions.  The Fock states of bosons and fermions obey useful relations with respect to the Fock space creation and annihilation operators.

Definition
One specifies a multiparticle state of N non-interacting identical particles by writing the state as a sum of tensor products of N one-particle states.  Additionally, depending on the integrality of the particles' spin, the tensor products must be alternating (anti-symmetric) or symmetric products of the underlying one-particle Hilbert space.  Specifically:

 Fermions, having half-integer spin and obeying the Pauli exclusion principle, correspond to antisymmetric tensor products. 
 Bosons, possessing integer spin (and not governed by the exclusion principle) correspond to symmetric tensor products.

If the number of particles is variable, one constructs the Fock space as the direct sum of the tensor product Hilbert spaces for each particle number. In the Fock space, it is possible to specify the same state in a new notation, the occupancy number notation, by specifying the number of particles in each possible one-particle state.

Let  be an orthonormal basis of states in the underlying one-particle Hilbert space. This induces a corresponding basis of the Fock space called the "occupancy number basis". A quantum state in the Fock space is called a Fock state if it is an element of the occupancy number basis.

A Fock state satisfies an important criterion: for each i, the state is an eigenstate of the particle number operator  corresponding to the i-th elementary state ki. The corresponding eigenvalue gives the number of particles in the state. This criterion nearly defines the Fock states (one must in addition select a phase factor).

In this expression,  denotes the number of particles in the i-th state ki, and the particle number operator for the i-th state, acts on the Fock state in the following way:

 

Hence the Fock state is an eigenstate of the number operator with eigenvalue .

Fock states often form the most convenient basis of a Fock space. Elements of a Fock space that are superpositions of states of differing particle number (and thus not eigenstates of the number operator) are not Fock states. For this reason, not all elements of a Fock space are referred to as "Fock states".

If we define the aggregate particle number operator  as
 

the definition of Fock state ensures that the variance of measurement , i.e., measuring the number of particles in a Fock state always returns a definite value with no fluctuation.

Example using two particles
 .

So, we must have 

  for bosons and 
  for fermions.

Note that the number operator does not distinguish bosons from fermions; indeed, it just counts particles without regard to their symmetry type. To perceive any difference between them, we need other operators, namely the creation and annihilation operators.

Bosonic Fock state
Bosons, which are particles with integer spin, follow a simple rule: their composite eigenstate is symmetric under operation by an exchange operator. For example, in a two particle system in the tensor product representation we have  .

Boson creation and annihilation operators
We should be able to express the same symmetric property in this new Fock space representation. The action of these operators on a Fock state are given by the following two equations:

 Creation operator :
 
 Annihilation operator :

Non-Hermiticity of creation and annihilation operators
The bosonic Fock state  creation and annihilation operators are not Hermitian operators.

Operator identities
The commutation relations of creation and annihilation operators in a bosonic system are
 
 

N bosonic basis states

Action on some specific Fock states

Action of number operators

Number operators are Hermitian operators.

Symmetric behaviour of bosonic Fock states
The commutation relations of the creation and annihilation operators ensure that the bosonic Fock states have the appropriate symmetric behaviour under particle exchange. Here, exchange of particles between two states (say, l and m) is done by annihilating a particle in state l and creating one in state m.

Using the commutation relation we have, 
 

So, the Bosonic Fock state behaves to be symmetric under operation by Exchange operator.

Fermionic Fock state

Fermion creation and annihilation operators
To be able to retain the antisymmetric behaviour of fermions, for Fermionic Fock states we introduce non-Hermitian fermion creation and annihilation operators, defined for a Fermionic Fock state  as:

 The creation operator  acts as:
 
 The annihilation operator  acts as:
 

These two actions are done antisymmetrically, which we shall discuss later.

Operator identities
The anticommutation relations of creation and annihilation operators in a fermionic system are,
  

These anticommutation relations can be used to show antisymmetric behaviour of Fermionic Fock states.

Action of number operators

Maximum occupation number
The action of the number operator as well as the creation and annihilation operators might seem same as the bosonic ones, but the real twist comes from the maximum occupation number of each state in the fermionic Fock state.  Extending the 2-particle fermionic example above, we first must convince ourselves that a fermionic Fock state  is obtained by applying a certain sum of permutation operators to the tensor product of eigenkets as follows:
 

This determinant is called the Slater determinant. If any of the single particle states are the same, two rows of the Slater determinant would be the same and hence the determinant would be zero. Hence, two identical fermions must not occupy the same state (a statement of the Pauli exclusion principle). Therefore, the occupation number of any single state is either 0 or 1.  The eigenvalue associated to the fermionic Fock state  must be either 0 or 1.

N fermionic basis states

Action on some specific Fock states

Antisymmetric behaviour of Fermionic Fock state
Antisymmetric behaviour of Fermionic states under Exchange operator is taken care of the anticommutation relations. Here, exchange of particles between two states is done by annihilating one particle in one state and creating one in other.

Using the anticommutation relation we have 
 
 

but,

Thus, fermionic Fock states are antisymmetric under operation by particle exchange operators.

Fock states are not energy eigenstates in general
In second quantization theory, the Hamiltonian density function is given by 

The total Hamiltonian is given by

In free Schrödinger theory, 

and 

and 
 ,

where  is the annihilation operator.

 

Only for non-interacting particles do  and  commute; in general they do not commute. For non-interacting particles,
 

If they do not commute, the Hamiltonian will not have the above expression. Therefore, in general, Fock states are not energy eigenstates of a system.

Vacuum fluctuations

The electrical and magnetic fields and the vector potential have the mode expansion of the same general form:

Thus it is easy to see that the expectation values of these field operators vanishes in the vacuum state:

However, it can be shown that the expectation values of the square of these field operators is non-zero. Thus there are fluctuations in the field about the zero ensemble average. These vacuum fluctuations are responsible for many interesting phenomenon including the Lamb shift in quantum optics.

Multi-mode Fock states
In a multi-mode field each creation and annihilation operator operates on its own mode.

The creation and annihilation operators operate on the multi-mode state by only raising or lowering the number state of their own mode:

We also define the total number operator for the field which is a sum of number operators of each mode:

The multi-mode Fock state is an eigenvector of the total number operator whose eigenvalue is the total occupation number of all the modes

In case of non-interacting particles, number operator and Hamiltonian commute with each other and hence multi-mode Fock states become eigenstates of the multi-mode Hamiltonian

Source of single photon state

Single photons are routinely generated using single emitters (atoms, Nitrogen-vacancy center, Quantum dot). However, these sources are not always very efficient, often presenting a low probability of actually getting a single photon on demand; and often complex and unsuitable out of a laboratory environment.

Other sources are commonly used that overcome these issues at the expense of a nondeterministic behavior. Heralded single photon sources are probabilistic two-photon sources from whom the pair is split and the detection of one photon heralds the presence of the remaining one. These sources usually rely on the optical nonlinearity of some materials like periodically poled Lithium niobate (Spontaneous parametric down-conversion), or silicon (spontaneous Four-wave mixing) for example.

Non-classical behaviour
The Glauber–Sudarshan P-representation of Fock states shows that these states are purely quantum mechanical and have no classical counterpart. The  of these states in the representation is a 'th derivative of the Dirac delta function and therefore not a classical probability distribution.

See also
Coherent states
Heisenberg limit
Nonclassical light

References

External links
Vladan Vuletic of MIT has used an ensemble of atoms to produce a Fock state (a.k.a. single photon) source (PDF)
 Produce and measure a single photon state (Fock state) with an interactive experiment QuantumLab

Quantum optics
Quantum field theory